Stocks is a surname. Notable people with the surname include:

 Amber Stocks (born 1978), American basketball coach
 Cyril Stocks (1905–1989), English footballer
 David Stocks (born 1943), English footballer
 Edward Stocks (1856–1876), English cricketer and athlete
 Francis Stocks (1873–1929), English cricketer and schoolteacher
 Frederick Stocks senior (1883–1954), English cricketer
 Frederick Stocks junior (1918–1996), English cricketer
 Harold Carpenter Lumb Stocks (1884–1956), English cathedral organist
 John Stocks (disambiguation), various people
 Lumb Stocks (1812–1892), English engraver
 Mary Stocks, Baroness Stocks (1891–1975), British writer, suffragist and principal of Westfield College
Minna Stocks (1846-1928), German painter 
 Nigel G. Stocks (born 1964), British physicist who discovered suprathreshold stochastic resonance, with application to cochlear implant technology
 Samuel Stocks (c.1786–1863), British businessman in South Australia with his son Samuel Stocks (c.1812–1850)
 Tamara Stocks (born 1979), American basketball player

See also
 Stock (surname)